Intel Parallel Studio XE was a software development product developed by Intel that facilitated native code development on Windows, macOS and Linux in C++ and Fortran for parallel computing. Parallel programming enables software programs to take advantage of multi-core processors from Intel and other processor vendors.

Intel Parallel Studio XE was rebranded and repackaged by Intel when oneAPI toolkits were released in December 2020.  Intel oneAPI Base Toolkit + Intel oneAPI HPC toolkit contain all the tools in Parallel Studio XE and more.  One significant addition is a Data Parallel C++ (DPC++) compiler designed to allow developers to reuse code across hardware targets (CPUs and accelerators such as GPUs and FPGAs).

Components 
Parallel Studio is composed of several component parts, each of which is a collection of capabilities.  
 Intel C++ Compiler with OpenMP
 Intel Fortran Compiler with OpenMP
 IDE plug-in integration with Visual Studio, Eclipse and Xcode
 Debugging via Visual Studio Debugger extensions, GNU Debugger extensions
Integrated Performance Primitives (IPP)
Math Kernel Library (MKL)
Threading Building Blocks (TBB)
Data Analytics Acceleration Library (DAAL)
 Intel Advisor - specialized performance profiler to optimize vectorization and a thread prototyping system for adding / improving threading. 
Intel VTune Profiler (formerly VTune Amplifier) is a performance profiler that analyzes hotspots, threading, I/O, FPGA, GPU, system, throttling and microarchitecture bottlenecks.
 Intel Inspector improves reliability by identifying memory errors and threading errors.
 Intel MPI Library – a multi-fabric message passing library that implements the Message Passing Interface specification across Intel platforms
 Intel Trace Analyzer and Collector - a graphical tool for understanding MPI application behavior, finding bottlenecks and errors in parallel cluster applications based on Intel architecture
 Intel Cluster Checker – Prepackaged checks to diagnose cluster health, functionality and performance. They are accessible via API to embed capabilities into applications. 
 Intel Distribution for Python – a Python distribution using Intel Performance libraries to boost performance of NumPy, SciPy, scikit-learn, Pandas (software) and other packages.

History 
Intel announced Parallel Studio during their Intel Developer Forum in August 2008 along with a web site to sign up for their open beta program. On 26 May 2009, Intel announced that it had released the product to market. Intel and Microsoft worked together to make their products compatible by adopting a common runtime called the Microsoft Concurrency Runtime, which is part of Visual Studio 2010.

Intel released a new version, Intel Parallel Studio 2011, on September 2, 2010.

Intel released Intel Parallel Studio XE 2013, on September 5, 2012.

Intel released Intel Parallel Studio XE 2015, on August 26, 2014.

Intel released Intel Parallel Studio XE 2016, on August 25, 2015.

Intel released Intel Parallel Studio XE 2017 on September 6, 2016.

Intel released Intel Parallel Studio XE 2018 on September 12, 2017 

Intel released Intel Parallel Studio XE 2019 on September 12, 2018 

Intel released Intel Parallel Studio XE 2020 on December 16, 2019

Intel released oneAPI toolkits replacing Intel Parallel Studio XE on December 8, 2020

See also 

 Intel Concurrent Collections
 Intel Developer Zone

References

External links
 
 Threading Building Blocks Open Source Project Home
 Cilk Plus Open Source Project Home 
 Intel's 'Parallelism Breakthrough' video series
 Parallel Studio Video Tour
 Intel Releases Parallel Studio (Dr. Dobbs)
 Intel addresses development life cycle with Parallel Studio (SDTimes)

Application programming interfaces
C++ programming language family
Generic programming
Parallel Studio
Profilers
Threads (computing)